Laura Boccanera (born September 13, 1961) is an Italian voice actress.

Biography
Born in Rome, Boccanera started her voice acting career early in the 1980s. She is best known as the official Italian voice of Jodie Foster and other actresses she has often or occasionally dubbed include Julia Roberts, Sandra Bullock, Famke Janssen, Juliette Lewis, Winona Ryder, Annabella Sciorra and Catherine Keener. One of her most popular animated dubbing roles includes voicing Belle in the Italian dub of Beauty and the Beast, as well Morgana McCawber in the Italian dub of Darkwing Duck and Miranda Wright in the Italian dub of Bonkers.

Some of Boccanera's other dubbing contributions include Bellatrix Lestrange (portrayed by Helena Bonham Carter) in the Harry Potter film series as well as Claire Underwood (portrayed by Robin Wright) in House of Cards.

Dubbing roles

Animation
Belle in Beauty and the Beast, Beauty and the Beast: The Enchanted Christmas and Belle's Magical World
Nala in The Lion King and The Lion King II: Simba's Pride
Morgana McCawber in Darkwing Duck
Miranda Wright in Bonkers
Sadira in Aladdin
Teela in He-Man and the Masters of the Universe (Season 1)
Anne-Marie in Belle and Sebastian
Candice White Ardlray in Candy Candy
Yoko Misaki in Goliath the Super Fighter
Midori in Grendizer
Princess Cecilia of Finland in Hans Christian Andersen's The Little Mermaid
Sally in The Nightmare Before Christmas
Sally in Sally the Witch
Princess Odette in The Swan Princess
Marie Antoinette in The Rose of Versailles
Kozue Ayuhara in Attack No. 1
 Rita the Fox in Jungledyret Hugo 2 - den store filmhelt
 Penny Sanchez in ChalkZone

Live action
Alexandra Rover in Nim's Island
Clarice Starling in The Silence of the Lambs
Kathryn Railly in 12 Monkeys
Capucine Jamet in A Girl Cut in Two
Cynthia in A Walk to Remember
The Wachati Princess in Ace Ventura: When Nature Calls
Princess Isabelle in Braveheart
Penny in Broken Flowers
Mrs. Reed in Jane Eyre
Bellatrix Lestrange in Harry Potter and the Order of the Phoenix
Bellatrix Lestrange in Harry Potter and the Half-Blood Prince
Bellatrix Lestrange in Harry Potter and the Deathly Hallows – Part 1
Bellatrix Lestrange in Harry Potter and the Deathly Hallows – Part 2
Claire Underwood in House of Cards
Mia in Love Actually
Tracy Atwood in Mr. Brooks
Ruth in Nine Lives
Catherine Deane in The Cell
Carla Purty in The Nutty Professor
Annette Jennings in The Safety of Objects 
Diane Shaver in The Vanishing
Audrey Billings in Transporter 2
Grace McKenna in U Turn
Betty Carver in What's Eating Gilbert Grape

Personal life
Boccanera is the sister of the voice actor Fabio Boccanera, and the cousin of  Massimo Rossi, Emanuela Rossi and Riccardo Rossi, all of whom are also voice actors.

References

External links 

1961 births
Living people
Actresses from Rome
Italian voice actresses
Italian voice directors
20th-century Italian actresses
21st-century Italian actresses